The rivière de la Ferme (in English: Farm river) is a tributary of the south shore of the St. Lawrence River. This river flows in the territory of the town of Bécancour, in the Bécancour Regional County Municipality, in the administrative region of Centre-du-Québec, in Quebec, in Canada.

Geography 

The main neighboring watersheds of the Rivière de la Ferme are:
 North side: St. Lawrence River;
 East side: rivière du Moulin, rivière aux Glaises, rivière aux Orignaux;
 South side: Gentilly River, Beaudet River;
 West side: Gentilly River.

The Rivière de la Ferme has its source in an agricultural zone to the south of the village of Gentilly and to the north of the Gentilly river.

  west, to Chemin Saint-François-Xavier;
  north, to Chemin des Bouvreuils;
  north, passing west of the village of Gentilly, to route 132;
  north, up to its confluence.

The Rivière de la Ferme flows into La Petite Anse opposite the Gentilly flats on the south shore of the St. Lawrence River. Its confluence is located to the west of the village of Gentilly and to the west of the town of Bécancour.

Toponymy 
The toponym Rivière de la Ferme was formalized on December 5, 1968, at the Commission de toponymie du Québec.

See also 

 List of rivers of Quebec

References 

Rivers of Centre-du-Québec
Bécancour Regional County Municipality